HM Prison Durham is a Georgian era reception Category B men's prison, located in the Elvet area of Durham in County Durham, England. Built in 1819, the prison continues to be operated by His Majesty's Prison Service. Women prisoners were moved in 2005 due to overcrowding and suicides.

History
The Northgate was established in Saddler Street in around 1072. It was rebuilt by Bishop Thomas Langley in the early 15th century to provide custodial facilities, which became known as the Northgate Prison or the County Gaol, and it was enlarged in 1773. There was also a House of Correction, also known as the Bridewell, which was established on the north side of Elvet Bridge in 1634. 

In the early 19th century it was decided to consolidate these two institutions at the current site, just south of the new Durham Courthouse: the new prison, consisting of some 600 cells, opened in 1819.

In 1832, protests over working conditions in the South Shields workhouse were supported by miner strikes. Soldiers were sent to evict striking miners from their pubs. One miner, William Jobling, was convicted of the murder of a local magistrate near Jarrow Slake. He was hanged amid heightened security of 50 mounted Hussars and 50 infantrymen to protect the gallows. His body was gibbeted after death. The prison's C wing was built in 1850. Between 1869 and 1958, 95 judicial executions took place on the gallows at Durham prison or the court house.

Irish Republicans were imprisoned in Durham in 1918.

On 17 December 1958, the final execution took place when Private Brian Chandler (aged 20) was hanged for the murder of Martha Dodd during the course of theft. Chandler was a soldier, based at Catterick camp, who beat 83-year-old Dodd to death with a hammer.

During the late 1960s and 1970s the prison became a study project for Stan Cohen and Laurie Taylor, which led to their publication of three books, namely Psychological Survival: The Experience of Long-term Imprisonment (1972), Escape Attempts (1976) and Prison Secrets (1978). Cohen additionally published Visions of Social Control: Crime, Punishment and Classification (1985).

In 1990 a 19-year-old-prisoner Darren Brook was murdered by another prisoner. 

Durham (which was a Category A prison for men and women at the time) was praised in 2001 by Her Majesty's Chief Inspector of Prisons for its progressive regime, integration of inmates and falling levels of violence. However, in 2003 it was revealed that Durham had the highest suicide rate of all prisons in England.

In 2004 a report by the Chief Inspector of Prisons criticised Durham for being severely overcrowded. The report highlighted the lack of education and work opportunities for inmates at the prison. In 2005 Durham's female high-security wing with 120 prisoners was discontinued and the prisoners transferred elsewhere, after HM Inspectorate of Prisons reports concluded, following several suicides, that it was unsuitable for housing female prisoners.

On 13 July 2011 it was announced that along with several other prisons, HMP Durham would be put up for market testing as part of a Ministry of Justice budget plan to make savings of almost 25%.

A 2014 report by HM Inspectorate of Prisons found that a third of inmates tested positive for drug use, a rate almost twice as high as would be expected in similar prisons. Rates of violence were also higher than expected which indicated that monitoring should be improved. The prison was, however, praised for the quality of work activity and learning available to prisoners.

In 2018 the Channel 4 documentary Prison was filmed over a 7 month period in the jail.

21st Century
As of 2022, Durham is a Reception prison for remand adult/ young male prisoners, primarily serving the courts of County Durham, Tyne and Wear, Teesside and Cumbria
It is divided into seven wingspans secure units, plus a segregation section and healthcare section. The prison offers part-time education to all inmates, including courses on data input, bricklaying, woodwork, painting and decorating, waste management and gardening.

Notable inmates

Current
Colin Ash-Smith

Former
 
Martina Anderson
 Mary Ann Cotton
 Sandra Gregory
 Myra Hindley
 Marie Therese Kouao
 Bernadette McNeilly
 Ruth Neave
 Carole Richardson
 Maria Rossi
 Judith Ward
 Rosemary West

  
 Ian Brady
 Keith 'Mad Dog' Brumwell
 Andy Ferrell
 Kieran Kelly
 Ronald Kray
 John McVicar
 Raoul Moat
 Charlie Richardson
 Eddie Richardson
 John Straffen

Film and TV links
 The 1980 British film McVicar starring Roger Daltrey is partially set in Durham Prison.
 The Prison is featured in Longford (2006) - Myra Hindley as an inmate

References

External links
 
History of Durham Gaol from theprison.org.uk 
 Ministry of Justice pages on Durham

Durham
Buildings and structures in Durham, England
Prisons in County Durham
19th-century establishments in England
Durham
Women's prisons in England